The White River Railroad was a wholly owned subsidiary of the Chicago and West Michigan Railroad incorporated on November 13, 1879, for the purpose of constructing a rail link north from the C&WM's line at White Cloud to the Flint and Pere Marquette Railroad's main line (Ludington–Monroe) at Baldwin, and to exploit the ample timber resources of the White River area. On April 1, 1880, the White River opened a  line from White Cloud north to Merrill Township, in Newaygo County. In 1881 the line was extended a further  to what would become Bitely in 1889.

On the completion of the first segment of the line in 1880 the C&WM had leased the White River for a period of 999 years (effectively in perpetuity). When in 1881 the C&WM reorganized as the Chicago and West Michigan Railway this arrangement continued. The annual reports filed to the Michigan Railroad Commission listed the White River's trackage with the C&WM; under the White River's own report appeared the banner "Controlled and Operated by the Chicago & West Michigan Railway Company." Finally, on February 7, 1884, the C&WM bought the White River, and it ceased to exist as an independent company. During its short operating history the White River turned a profit, due in large part to lumber revenues; the company issued a dividend in 1882 and never floated a bond, which was unusual for a construction railroad.

The White Cloud–Baldwin line survived the cutbacks of the 20th century and as of 2011 is operated by Marquette Rail, a short-line railroad which leased CSX Transportation's Ludington and Manistee Subdivisions on November 12, 2005. Among other commodities, the Marquette Rail hauls paperboard, continuing the White River's old purpose as a lumber road.

Notes

References 

Railway companies established in 1879
Railway companies disestablished in 1884
Defunct Michigan railroads
Predecessors of the Pere Marquette Railway